is a railway station on the Toei Mita Line in Itabashi, Tokyo, Japan, operated by the Tokyo subway operator Tokyo Metropolitan Bureau of Transportation (Toei).

Lines
Shin-takashimadaira Station is served by the Toei Mita Line, and is numbered "I-26".

Station layout
The station has two side platforms on the second-floor ("2F") level serving two tracks.

Platforms

History
The station opened on 6 May 1976.

See also
 List of railway stations in Japan

External links

 Toei station information

Railway stations in Tokyo
Railway stations in Japan opened in 1976
Toei Mita Line